A typical issue of Mad magazine will include at least one full parody of a popular movie or television show. The titles are changed to create a play on words; for instance, The Addams Family became The Adnauseum Family. The character names are generally switched in the same fashion.

These articles typically cover five pages or more, and are presented as a sequential storyline with caricatures and word balloons. The opening page or two-page splash usually consists of the cast of the show introducing themselves directly to the reader; in some parodies, the writers sometimes attempt to circumvent this convention by presenting the characters without such direct exposition. Many parodies end with the abrupt deus ex machina appearance of outside characters or pop culture figures who are similar in nature to the movie or TV series being parodied, or who comment satirically on the theme. For example, Dr. Phil arrives to counsel the Desperate Housewives, or the cast of Sex and the City show up as the new hookers on Deadwood.

The parodies frequently make comedic use of the fourth wall, breaking character, and meta-references. Within an ostensibly self-contained storyline, the characters may refer to the technical aspects of filmmaking, the publicity, hype, or box office surrounding their project, their own past roles, any clichés being used, and so on.

Several show business stars have been quoted to the effect that the moment when they knew they'd finally "made it" was when they saw themselves thus depicted in the pages of Mad.
The following list of all the TV show spoofs in Mad Magazine is ordered by the decades in which they were produced.

TV shows spoofs list

1950s

1960s

1970s

1980s

1990s

2000s

2010s

2020s

See also
 List of film spoofs in Mad
 Mad (magazine)

References

External links
 The Mad Cover Site's list of television parodies.

Lists of television series

Parodies of television shows